is a Japanese football player. He plays for Azul Claro Numazu.

Career
Koki Maezawa joined Japan Football League club Sony Sendai in 2015. In 2017, he moved to J3 League club Azul Claro Numazu.

Club statistics
Updated to 20 February 2018.

References

External links
Profile at Azul Claro Numazu

1993 births
Living people
Senshu University alumni
Association football people from Shizuoka Prefecture
Japanese footballers
J3 League players
Japan Football League players
Sony Sendai FC players
Azul Claro Numazu players
Association football midfielders